The Acton by-election of 28 March 1968 was held after the death of Labour Member of Parliament (MP) Bernard Floud  on 10 October 1967. The seat, previously Labour, was gained by the Conservatives in a defeat for Harold Wilson's government. It was one of the three Conservative gains from Labour on the same day, the others being at Meriden and Dudley. The by-election also marked the first electoral appearance of the National Front, who finished fourth.

Results

References

Acton by-election
Acton,1968
Acton,1968
Acton by-election
Acton, London
Acton by-election